This is a list of Wisconsin synagogues.

See also

List of Jewish communities by country
List of Jewish communities in North America
List of Yeshivas and Midrashas in Israel

References

Synagogue
 
Wisconsin
Synagogues